CFCJ-FM is a Christian radio station which broadcasts at 102.1 MHz (FM) in Cochrane, Ontario, Canada.

History

On April 18, 2011, Cochrane Christian Radio (CCR) received an approval by the Canadian Radio-television and Telecommunications Commission (CRTC) to operate a new English language low-power specialty FM radio programming undertaking to provide a Christian music service at 102.1 MHz in Cochrane, Ontario.

Cochrane Christian Radio (inc) is owner of CFCJ-FM.

The launch kick-off date was September 5, 2011 at the Glad Tidings Pentecostal Church in Cochrane.

References

External links
www.102fm.ca 
 

FCJ
FCJ
Cochrane, Ontario
Radio stations established in 2011
2011 establishments in Ontario